Argyroeides braco is a moth of the subfamily Arctiinae. It was described by Gottlieb August Wilhelm Herrich-Schäffer in 1855. It is found in São Paulo, Brazil.

References

Moths described in 1855
Argyroeides
Moths of South America